Iraqi Sign Language is the deaf sign language of Iraq. It appears to be close to Levantine Arabic Sign Language the common sign language of Lebanon, Palestine, Syria, and Jordan. It is taught in seven schools or deaf associations in the capitol of Baghdad and 5 other cities.

Related Sign Languages 
In research done on Jordanian Sign Language, word lists from Baghdad were collected and compared to sign language from five other countries. It was found to have over 50% lexical similarities with the sign languages of Jordan and Syria

See also
Kurdish Sign Language
Levantine Arabic Sign Language

References

Sources
Hendriks, Bernadet, 2008. Jordanian Sign Language: aspects of grammar from a cross-linguistic perspective (dissertation)

Arab sign languages
Languages of Iraq
Sign languages of Iraq